Maria of Hanau-Münzenberg (20 January 1562 – 15 February 1605 in Frankfurt) was the youngest daughter of Count Philip III (1526-1561) and Countess Palatine Helena of Simmern (1532-1579).  She was born after her father's death and remained unmarried.

As with many female members of aristocratic families of the period who did not belong to important royal houses, the research into her life has many gaps.   A very incomplete picture of her life is known; only a few unusual facts, such as that she remained unmarried.  This was unintended; her mother's relatives tried to arrange a marriage into the House of Wittelsbach for her in 1573.

Life 
In the fierce dispute between the regents of her nephew Count Philip Louis II and his brother Albert, which was mainly about whether their wards should be raised in the Calvinist of Lutheran faith, she supported the Lutheran side, which was represented by Count Philip IV of Hanau-Lichtenberg, and later by his son Philip V. The Lutheran side eventually lost.

She lived on her own in Hanau and this, along with her allegedly too expensive court, drew criticism from her opponents, led by Count Palatine John Casimir of Simmern, who was the regent of the Electorate of the Palatinate.  Another criticism was that among her personnel were a midwife and the sister-in-law of an executioner.  She was supported by the Lutheran Count Palatine Richard of Simmern-Sponheim, who tried to stem Calvinist offensive, together with the Counts of Hanau-Lichtenberg. As this conflict was not only about religion, but also about which member of the House of Hanau would act as regent for whom, Count Palatine John Casimir intervened immediately when Count Philip V of Hanau-Lichtenberg offered Maria accommodation in his castle in Babenhausen.

Maria died on 15 February 1605 in Frankfurt.  The fact that she died in Frankfurt is a further indication that she led quite an independent life for a lady of her era.  She was buried in the Church of St. Mary in Hanau.

Ancestors

References 
 Friedrich von Bezold: Briefe des Pfalzgrafen Johann Casimir mit verwandten Schriftstücken gesammelt und bearbeitet, vol. 3, Munich, 1903
 Fr. W. Cuno: Philipp Ludwig II., Graf zu Hanau und Rieneck, Herr zu Münzenberg, Prague, 1896, p. 13 ff
 Adrian Willem Eliza Dek: De Afstammelingen van Juliana van Stolberg tot aan het jaar van de vrede van Munster, Zaltbommel, 1968
 Reinhard Dietrich: Die Landesverfassung in dem Hanauischen, in the series Hanauer Geschichtsblätter, vol. 34, Hanau, 1996, 
 Hans-Georg Stumm: Pfalzgraf Reichard von Simmern, thesis, Trier, 1968
 Reinhard Suchier: Genealogie des Hanauer Grafenhauses, in: Festschrift des Hanauer Geschichtsvereins zu seiner fünfzigjährigen Jubelfeier am 27. August 1894, Hanau, 1894
 Reinhard Suchier: Die Grabmonumente und Särge der in Hanau bestatteten Personen aus den Häusern Hanau und Hessen, in: Programm des Königlichen Gymnasiums zu Hanau, Hanau, 1879. p. 1-56
 Ernst J. Zimmermann: Hanau Stadt und Land, 3rd ed., Hanau, 1919, reprinted: 1978

Footnotes 

House of Hanau
1562 births
1605 deaths
16th-century German people